Daniel Pérez may refer to:

Daniel Ayala Pérez (1906–1975), Mexican violinist and composer
Daniel Rodríguez Pérez (born 1977), Spanish professional footballer
Daniel Pérez (basketball) Paraguayan basketball player
Daniel Pérez (footballer, born 1975), Argentine–born Chilean former footballer
Daniel Pérez (footballer, born 2002), Venezuelan footballer
Dani Pérez (born 2005), Spanish footballer
Daniel Perez (boccia), Dutch Paralympic boccia player